Papaaroa Adventist School is a coeducational Christian school in Rarotonga, Cook Islands, established in 1938.

See also
List of Seventh-day Adventist secondary schools

References

External links
Official Website

PHS
Schools in the Cook Islands
Rarotonga
1938 establishments in the Cook Islands